The women's pole vault event at the 2011 All-Africa Games was held on 12 September.

Results

References
Results
Results

Pole
2011 in women's athletics